PSB-SB-487 is a coumarin derivative which is an antagonist at the former orphan receptor GPR55. Unlike older GPR55 antagonists such as O-1918, PSB-SB-487 has good selectivity over the related receptor GPR18, with an IC50 of 113nM at GPR55 vs 12500nM at GPR18. However it has poorer selectivity over other related receptors, acting as a weak antagonist at CB1 with a Ki of 1170nM, and a partial agonist at CB2 with a Ki of 292nM.

See also 
 CID-16020046
 PSB-SB-1202

References 

Cannabinoids
Coumarins